Hendrar Prihadi (born 30 March 1971), sometimes nicknamed Hendi, is the mayor of Semarang, Central Java since 2013 until 2022, following his predecessor's arrest over a corruption charge. He is set to serve as Mayor until 2020 following his victory in the 2015 mayoral elections.

Personal life
Prihadi completed his first 12 years of education before graduating from Soegijapranata Catholic University in 1997, and later he earned his Masters in Management from Diponegoro University in 2002, all in Semarang. During his education, he served as president of several youth organizations in the provincial level.

He married Krisseptiana in 5 December 1997, and the couple has 3 children.

Career
Before becoming active in the city government, Prihadi worked in several companies and served as an official of the Central Java branch of KADIN (Kamar Dagang dan Industri Indonesia, Indonesian Board of Trade and Industry) which was an organization of Indonesian businessmen, in addition to the Semarang branch of the PSSI.

Political career
After serving in the city council for 3 months, Prihadi was elected as deputy mayor along with Soemarmo after winning 34.28% of the votes. Following Soemarmo's arrest in 2013 over a corruption charge, Prihadi was elevated to mayor and later won in the 2015 elections after him and his deputy Hevearita Gunaryanti won 319,076 votes (46.32%).

References

Living people
People from Semarang
1971 births
21st-century Indonesian politicians
Indonesian Democratic Party of Struggle politicians
Mayors and regents of places in Central Java
Mayors of places in Indonesia